The Swedish Cross-Country Skiing Championships were first held in Härnösand in 1910. and originally only featured men's competitions. before women's competitions were introduced in 1917.

Places

Main events
1910: Härnösand
1911: Gävle
1912: Bollnäs
1913: Östersund
1914: Östersund
1915: Ludvika
1916: Örnsköldsvik
1917: Stockholm
1918: Sundsvall
1919: Saltsjöbaden
1920: Boden
1922: Stockholm
1923: Härnösand
1924: Filipstad
1925: Östersund
1926: Luleå
1927: Örnsköldsvik
1928: Sundsvall
1929: Hudiksvall
1930: Arvika
1931: Umeå
1932: Östersund
1933: Boden
1934: Lycksele
1935: Falun
1936: Luleå
1937: Örnsköldsvik
1938: Sollefteå
1939: Filipstad
1940: Sundsvall
1941: Umeå
1942: Hudiksvall
1943: Östersund
1944: Boden
1945: Kramfors
1946: Skellefteå
1947: Falun
1948: Kiruna
1949: Härnösand
1950: Örnsköldsvik
1951: Söderhamn
1952: Umeå
1953: Filipstad
1954: Lycksele
1955: Sundsvall
1956: Östersund
1957: Malung
1958: Kalix
1959: Skellefteå
1960: Hudiksvall
1961: Umeå
1962: Sollefteå
1963: Luleå
1964: Rättvik
1965: Lycksele
1966: Arvika
1967: Örnsköldsvik
1968: Kiruna
1969: Östersund
1970: Borlänge
1971: Skellefteå
1972: Sollefteå
1973: Lycksele
1974: Malmberget
1975: Umeå
1976: Umeå
1977: Sundsvall
1978: Piteå
1979: Mora
1980: Hudiksvall
1981: Filipstad
1982: Skövde
1983: Östersund
1984: Luleå
1985: Borlänge
1986: Örebro
1987: Örnsköldsvik
1988: Skellefteå
1989: Bollnäs
1990: Östersund (moved from Haninge)
1991: Timrå
1992: Kiruna
1993: Örnsköldsvik (moved from Borås)
1994: Sollefteå
1995: Sunne
1996: Umeå
1997: Åsarna
1998: Sundsvall/Skellefteå
1999: Piteå
2000: Östersund
2001: Filipstad/Umeå
2002: Gällivare
2003: Idre/Boden
2004: Skellefteå
2005: Hudiksvall/Luleå
2006: Boden/Luleå
2007: Åsarna (moved from Hudiksvall, Östersund, Bruksvallarna
2008: Falun/Borlänge/Orsa
2009: Sundsvall/Åsarna
2010: Piteå/Skellefteå
2011: Sundsvall (SM-veckan)/Piteå (relays)/Bruksvallarna (30/50 kilometres)
2012: Östersund (SM-veckan)/Långberget (relays and 30/50 kilometres)
2013: Falun (SM-veckan)/Boden (team sprint and 30/50 kilometres)
2014: Umeå (SM-veckan)/Åsarna (moved from Hudiksvall, team sprint and 30/50 kilometres)
2015: Örebro (SM-veckan)/Kalix (sprint relays and 30/50 kilometres)
2016: Piteå (SM-veckan)/Gällivare (sprint relays and 30/50 kilometres)
2017: Söderhamn (SM-veckan)/Umeå (sprint relays and 30/50 kilometres)
2018: Skellefteå (SM-veckan)/Bruksvallarna (sprint relays and supersprint)
2019: Sundsvall (SM-veckan)/Gällivare (30/50 kilometres)/Bruksvallarna (sprint relay)
2020: Cancelled because of the Cancelled because of the Corona pandemic
2021: Borås/Kalix
2022: Piteå (SM-veckan)/Bruksvallarna (sprint relays)

Pursuit
1994: Hudiksvall
1995: Sundsvall
1996: Ulricehamn
1997: Nässjö
1998: Sundsvall
1999: Norberg
2000: Jönköping
2001: Filipstad
2002: Garphyttan
2003: Haninge
2004: Nässjö

Skiathlon
2005: Sundsvall

Sprint
2000: Åsarna
2001: Umeå
2002: Åsarna
2003: Boden
2004: Skellefteå
2005: Tynderö

Roller skiing
2010: Trollhättan
2011: Hudiksvall
2012: Lidköping
2013: Halmstad (SM-veckan), Falköping (mass start and hill)

References 

1910 establishments in Sweden
Cross-country skiing competitions in Sweden
January sporting events
February sporting events
March sporting events
Recurring sporting events established in 1910
National cross-country skiing competitions
Cross-Country